Ostrocerca truncata, the truncate forestfly, is a species of spring stonefly in the family Nemouridae. It is found in North America.

References

Further reading

 
 
 
 
 
 
 

Nemouridae